Carolyn Chalmers Simpson  (born 30 March 1946) was a judge of the Supreme Court of New South Wales for 24 years and of its Court of Appeal for nearly three. Justice Simpson made legal history in 1999 as one of three women judges who formed the first all-female bench to sit in an Australian court. In 194-year history, she is the second woman appointed to the court.

Early life and education
Simpson was born 30 March 1946, at Forbes in the Central West of New South Wales, to William George and Janet Bower Chalmers.

She received her education as a boarder at the Presbyterian Ladies' College, Sydney at Croydon, and following matriculation attended Bathurst Teachers College (an antecedent to Charles Sturt University), graduating with a Diploma of Education in 1965. After five years of teaching followed by a failed attempt to gain employment as a journalist, a friend suggested she study law. She graduated from the University of Sydney with a Bachelor of Arts and then completed the Barristers Admission Board examinations.

Career
Simpson served as an associate to a District Court judge. It was here that she realised  her passion for law, stating: "I got hooked."

She was admitted to the New South Wales bar in 1976 and appointed a Queen's Counsel in 1989. In 1994, she was appointed a judge of the Supreme Court of New South Wales.

Justice Simpson made headlines in April 1999, when she and Justices Margaret Beazley and Virginia Bell sat in the Supreme Court of New South Wales#Structure and jurisdiction\Court of Criminal Appeal in Sydney. The judges threw out an appeal from a convicted computer hacker who had, out of "sheer maliciousness", been posting offensive messages on Ausnet's homepage. According to the Women Lawyers Association of NSW, there had never been an all-female bench in England or New Zealand at the time.  Subsequently, Simpson observed that, as more women were appointed judges in the Supreme Court, there would be more benches of three. "Given the opportunity, women achieve and do as well as men", she said.

Simpson sat in the Common Law Division of the Supreme Court of NSW until her elevation to the Court of Appeal in June 2015. Simpson retired as a full judge on 29 March 2018, however continues to work as an Acting Justice of Appeal in the NSW Court of Appeal.

In the 2019 Queen's Birthday Honours Simpson was appointed Officer of the Order of Australia for her "distinguished service to the law, and to the judiciary, particularly in the areas of criminal, defamation, administrative and industrial law".

Notable decisions
Justice Simpson has presided over a number of high-profile cases. She was the judge responsible for sentencing Neddy Smith, a notorious gangland murderer, to life imprisonment in 1989.

In 2005, she presided over the much publicised case Network Ten v Jessica Rowe.  Ten claimed that the 5pm Ten News reader had breached her "open-ended" contract by failing to give six months' notice in writing. Simpson dismissed the action and ordered Ten to pay Rowe's court costs, finding that the contract was for a closed period of two years and expired at the conclusion of the case.

She set a precedent in 2007 when she awarded around 1 million to a teenager who was bullied at primary school. She concluded that the school had "grossly failed" in its duty of care to Benjamin Cox, who now suffers from a severe psychiatric condition.

References

External links
Supreme Court of New South Wales

Australian King's Counsel
People educated at the Presbyterian Ladies' College, Sydney
1946 births
Living people
Judges of the Supreme Court of New South Wales
Australian women judges
Charles Sturt University alumni
People from the Central West (New South Wales)
University of Sydney alumni
20th-century Australian judges
21st-century Australian judges
Officers of the Order of Australia
20th-century women judges
21st-century women judges
20th-century Australian women